Nobuharu (written: 宣治, 信春 or 信治) is a masculine Japanese given name. Notable people with the name include:

 (born 1972), Japanese sprinter and long jumper
 (1514/15 – 1575), Japanese samurai
 (1549–1570), Japanese samurai
, Japanese volleyball player
Yagyu Nobuharu (1919–2007), Japanese swordsman
 (born 13 October 1993), Japanese racing driver

Japanese masculine given names